The 2014–15 season of the Oberliga Rheinland-Pfalz/Saar, the highest association football league in the states of Saarland and Rhineland-Palatinate, was the seventh season of the league at tier five (V) of the German football league system and the 37th season overall since establishment of the league in 1978, then as the Oberliga Südwest.

The season began on 1 August 2014 and finished on 23 May 2015, interrupted by a lengthy winter break.

Final table 
The league featured four new clubs for the 2014–15 season with Saar 05 Saarbrücken and FV Diefflen promoted from the Saarlandliga, TSV Schott Mainz from the Verbandsliga Südwest and SpVgg EGC Wirges from the Rheinlandliga while no team had been relegated from the Regionalliga Südwest.

Top goalscorers
The top goal scorers for the season:

Promotion play-offs
Promotion play-offs will be held at the end of the season for both the Regionalliga above and the Oberliga.

To the Regionalliga
The runners-up of the Hessenliga, Oberliga Rheinland-Pfalz/Saar and the Oberliga Baden-Württemberg, TSV Lehnerz, SC Hauenstein and Bahlinger SC, played each other for one more spot in the Regionalliga. While the first game had been scheduled the second and third depended on the outcome of the first. Bahlinger SC won promotion to the Regionalliga courtesy to a win and a draw.

To the Oberliga
The runners-up of the Rheinlandliga, Verbandsliga Südwest and Saarlandliga played each other for one more spot in the Oberliga which SV Mehring won.

References

External links 
 Oberliga Rheinland-Pfalz/Saar on Fupa.net 

Oberliga Rheinland-Pfalz/Saar
Rheinland